L'Étoile de Séville (The Star of Seville) is a grand opera in four acts composed by Michael William Balfe to a libretto by Hippolyte Lucas based on Andrés de Claramonte's 1623 play . It premiered at the Théâtre de l'Académie Royale de Musique in Paris on 17 December 1845 with Rosine Stoltz in the title role.

Roles

References
Notes

Sources
Barrett, William Alexander (1882). Balfe: His Life and Work. Remington and Co.

Lucas, Hippolyte (1845). L'étoile de Séville: grand opéra en 4 actes (libretto). V. Jonas (Paris)
Pérez Fernández, Julián Jesús (2022), De La Estrella de Sevilla a L'Etoile de Séville, Editorial Universidad de Sevilla, Sevilla 

Operas by Michael Balfe
French-language operas
Grand operas
1845 operas
Operas based on plays
Operas
Opera world premieres at the Paris Opera